Michel J. Lhuillier Financial Services (Pawnshops), Inc., also known as M Lhuillier or MLhuillier,  is a non-banking financial services company based in the Philippines. The company was founded in 1992 by Michel J. Lhuillier.

The company’s services include logistics, pawn-broking, money remittance, insurance, bills payment, corporate payout, collections, and electronic reloading.

History 
M Lhuillier Financial Services was founded in 1992 by Michel J. Lhuillier. The company is headquartered in Cebu City, Philippines with the M Lhuillier Group of companies as the parent company.

References 

1992 establishments in the Philippines
Pawn shops